Batman is a 1986 isometric action-adventure game by Ocean Software for the Amstrad PCW, Amstrad CPC, ZX Spectrum, and MSX, and the first Batman game developed. The game received favourable reviews. An unrelated Batman game was released two years later, titled Batman: The Caped Crusader.

Gameplay

The object of the game is to rescue Robin by collecting the seven parts of the Batcraft hovercraft that are scattered around the Batcave. The gameplay takes place in a 3D isometric universe, which programmer Jon Ritman and artist Bernie Drummond would further develop for 1987's Head Over Heels, and is notable for implementing an early example of a save game system that allows players to restart from an intermediate point in the game on the loss of all lives rather than returning all the way to the start (in this case the point at which Batman collects a "Batstone").

Reception

Batman was received well by the computer game press at the time. Crash gave it a rating of 93%, Your Sinclair scored it 9/10 and Sinclair User gave it five stars and rated it as a "classic". The game reached the number one position in the Amstrad, ZX Spectrum and All-Format charts in the same week in May 1986.

Legacy
A freeware remake, called Watman, was released for MS-DOS in 2000. A remake called GWatman has also been written for the Game Boy Advance.

A remake for IBM PC compatibles  was produced by Retrospec.

A remake for MSX2 was produced by AAMSX and FX Software, for the MSX RU of 2014.

References

External links

Batman video games
Ocean Software games
1986 video games
Amstrad CPC games
Amstrad PCW games
MSX games
ZX Spectrum games
Video games with isometric graphics
Video games set in the United States
Superhero video games
Video games developed in the United Kingdom